A Stab in the Dark may refer to:

 A Stab in the Dark (TV series), a British television programme of topical monologues and discussion
 A Stab in the Dark (play)
 A Stab in the Dark (film), a 1999 Ghanaian film